The 1944 United States presidential election in Pennsylvania took place on November 7, 1944 as part of the 1944 United States presidential election. Voters chose 35 representatives, or electors to the Electoral College, who voted for president and vice president.

Pennsylvania voted to give Democratic nominee, President Franklin D. Roosevelt a record fourth term, over the Republican nominee, New York Governor Thomas E. Dewey. Roosevelt won Pennsylvania by a slim margin of 2.78%.

Results

Results by county

See also
 List of United States presidential elections in Pennsylvania

References

Pennsylvania
1944
1944 Pennsylvania elections